Christa Maria Ziese, also Christa-Maria Ziese, married name Christa Maria Ziese-Lüdeke (13 July 1924 – 22 January 2012) was a German  Lied, concert and operatic soprano.

Leben 
Ziese was born in Aschersleben. Her teachers were the pedagogues Gottlieb Zeithammer and Josef-Maria Hausschild in Leipzig. In 1949, she won the International Concours of Prague and in 1950, the third prize at the International Johann Sebastian Bach Competition in Leipzig She made her stage debut in 1947 at the Leipzig Opera as Hänsel in the opera Hänsel und Gretel and was then a member of this Opera house until 1951 and again from 1954 to 1977, but at the same time gave guest performances at the Berlin State Opera and Dresden as well as at the Komische Oper Berlin. In 1952-1954, she was engaged at the National Theatre in Weimar. Guest performances at the Bolshoi Theatre in Moscow, at the Deutsche Oper am Rhein, the Düsseldorf-Duisburg, at the opera houses of Hamburg, Hanover, Zurich, Brno and Nice followed. Her large, expressive soprano voice achieved its best performances in the highly dramatic repertoire. She sang among others the part of Leonore in Fidelio, Santuzza in Cavalleria rusticana, Salome, Aida, Tosca, Carmen, Turandot by Puccini, Senta in the Flying Dutchman, Isolde, Venus in Tannhäuser. The artist was also successful in concert hall. She was awarded the title of Kammersängerin. After finishing her stage career in 1977, she devoted herself especially to the training of young singers.

Ziese died in Meiningen aged 87.

She spent the rest of her life in Meiningen. She was buried in the grave of her husband Rainer Lüdeke on the Leipzig Südfriedhof.

Awards 
 On 6 October 1963, she was awarded the Nationalpreis der DDR III. class for art and literature.

References

External links 
 

German operatic sopranos
Voice teachers
Recipients of the National Prize of East Germany
1924 births
2012 deaths
People from Aschersleben